Koppelman is a surname. It may refer to:

 Andrew Koppelman (born 1957), professor of law and political science
 Brian Koppelman (born 1966), American filmmaker
 Chaim Koppelman (1920–2009), artist
 Charles Koppelman (1940–2022), American musician and businessman
 Elaine Koppelman (1937–2019), American mathematician
 Kim Koppelman (born 1956), politician
 Lee Koppelman (born 1928), urban planner
 Michael Koppelman, record producer
 N. Koppelman (1881–1944), chess player

See also
 Kopelman

Jewish surnames